This is a list of High Sheriffs of Pembrokeshire.  The High Sheriff is the oldest secular office under the Crown. Formerly the High Sheriff was the principal law enforcement officer in the county but over the centuries most of the responsibilities associated with the post have been transferred elsewhere or are now defunct, so that its functions are now largely ceremonial. The High Sheriff is reappointed in March of each year.

List of Sheriffs

16th Century

17th Century

18th Century

19th Century

20th Century

References

 
Pembrokeshire
Pembrokeshire